Crusheen GAA is a Gaelic Athletic Association club located in Crusheen, County Clare, Ireland.  The club is almost exclusively concerned with the game of hurling. In October 2010, Crusheen became Clare hurling champions for the first time in their 123-year history with a 2–13 to 1–11 win against Cratloe. In their first ever Munster Club Championship, they were defeated by Kilmallock in the quarter-final by 0–14 to 2–11 
In October 2011, Crusheen retained their county title after defeating Sixmilebridge at a waterlogged Cusack Park.

In November 2011, Crusheen played in their first ever Munster Senior Club Hurling Final against Na Piarsaigh from Limerick, the match finishing in a 0–14 to 1–11 draw. In the replay Na Piarsaigh won the title by 1–13 to 0–09.

Major honours
Munster Senior Club Hurling Championship Runners-Up: 2011
Clare Senior Hurling Championship (2): 2010, 2011
 Clare Intermediate Hurling Championship (3): 1960, 1987, 2000
 Clare Junior A Hurling Championship (5): 1934, 1941, 1944, 1959, 2010 
 Clare Under-21 A Hurling Championship (1): 1969
 Clare Under-21 B Hurling Championship (1): 2021 (with Tubber)

Noted hurlers

Cian Dillon
Donal Tuohy
Pat Vaughan
Mick Moroney

References

External links
Clare GAA site

Gaelic games clubs in County Clare
Hurling clubs in County Clare